The Napa Valley Challenger is a tennis tournament held in Napa, California, United States, since 2013. The event is part of the ATP Challenger Tour and is played on outdoor hard courts.

Past finals

Singles

Doubles

External links 
Official website
ITF Search

 
ATP Challenger Tour